Nemanja Bezbradica (born 29 May 1993) is a Serbian professional basketball player for BC Šiauliai of the Lithuanian Basketball League (LKL).

Professional career
Bezbradica started his career in OKK Beograd. He spent there one season, averaging 5.3 points and 2.8 rebounds per game in the Serbian League, and 8.7 points and 4.1 rebounds per game in the BIBL. Next season, he signed for BKK Radnički. In the 2012–13 Basketball League of Serbia, he averaged 9.3 points and 4.3 rebounds in 27 games for Crusaders.

In September 2013, Bezbradica signed a multi-year contract with Partizan. In his first season with Partizan, he won the Basketball League of Serbia defeating arch rivals Crvena zvezda with 3-1 in the final series. In July 2015, he left Partizan.

On 27 December 2015 Bezbradica signed with Zrinjski Mostar of the Bosnian League for the rest of the season. On 8 March 2016 he left Zrinjski and signed with Italian club Varese. However, he never played in an official game for Varese.

On 12 September 2016 Bezbradica signed a two-month deal with Latvian club VEF Riga. On 30 November 2016 he parted ways with Riga.

National team career
Bezbradica was a members of the Serbian under-18 national team that the silver medal at the 2011 FIBA Europe Under-18 Championship. Over eight tournament games he averaged 8.1 points and 3.5 rebounds per game.

References

External links
 Nemanja Bezbradica at aba-liga.com
 Nemanja Bezbradica at euroleague.net
 Nemanja Bezbradica at fiba.com

1993 births
Living people
ABA League players
Basketball players at the 2010 Summer Youth Olympics
Basketball League of Serbia players
BC Šiauliai players
BK VEF Rīga players
BKK Radnički players
Croatian expatriate basketball people in Serbia
KK Beovuk 72 players
KK Partizan players
OKK Beograd players
Power forwards (basketball)
People from the Republic of Serbian Krajina
Serbian men's basketball players
Serbian expatriate basketball people in Bosnia and Herzegovina
Serbian expatriate basketball people in Latvia
Serbian expatriate basketball people in the Czech Republic
Serbian men's 3x3 basketball players
Serbs of Croatia
Sportspeople from Knin
Youth Olympic gold medalists for Serbia